Mamanguaipe is a municipality in the state of Paraíba in the Northeast Region of Brazil.

The municipality contains part of the  Guaribas Biological Reserve, a fully protected conservation unit created in 1990.
It also contains the Pau-Brasil Ecological Station, which protects a stand of endangered Pau-Brazil (Caesalpinia echinata) trees.

See also
List of municipalities in Paraíba

References

Municipalities in Paraíba